Peneti (also Romanized as Penetī; also known as Lanīţī, Panīţī, and Tanīţī) is a village in Pian Rural District, in the Central District of Izeh County, Khuzestan Province, Iran. At the 2006 census, its population was 136, in 26 families.

References 

Populated places in Izeh County